The Ladon Lake ( Techniti Limni Ladona) or the Ladon Reservoir is an artificial lake in the upper part of the river Ladon, in the northwestern part of Arcadia, Greece. The 50 m high dam was built in 1955. The reservoir is situated in a sparsely populated, mountainous area. It is completely in the municipality Gortynia, municipal units Kleitor, Kontovazaina and Tropaia.

See also
List of lakes in Greece
List of reservoirs

References

External links
Ladon Lake on GTP Travel Pages (in English and Greek)

Landforms of Arcadia, Peloponnese
Lakes of Greece
Reservoirs in Greece
Landforms of Peloponnese (region)